Lena Grebak (born 18 September 1991) is a Danish badminton player. In 2015, she won the bronze medal at the European Games in the women's doubles event partnered with Maria Helsbøl. In 2016, she also won the bronze medal at the European Championships in the mixed doubles event partnered with Mathias Christiansen.

Achievements

European Games
Women's doubles

European Badminton Championships
Mixed oubles

BWF International Challenge/Series
Women's doubles

Mixed doubles

 BWF International Challenge tournament
 BWF International Series tournament
 BWF Future Series tournament

References

External links
 

1991 births
Living people
People from Køge Municipality
Danish female badminton players
Badminton players at the 2015 European Games
European Games bronze medalists for Denmark
European Games medalists in badminton
Sportspeople from Region Zealand
21st-century Danish women